"Pingüinos En La Cama" is a latin pop and ballad song written by Guatemalan latin pop singer-songwriter Ricardo Arjona for his tenth studio album, Adentro (2005). It was produced by Arjona, Dan Warner, Lee Levin and Tommy Torres and performed by Arjona.

The album includeas an additional version of the song, labeled "Piano & Strings version". A remix version featuring Spanish singer Chenoa was also produced. The remix was released as the second single from the album in January 2006. Both versions charted together on Billboard charts.

Music video 
The music video for "Pingüinos En La Cama" was recorded in Buenos Aires, Argentina, in 2006. Argentinian model Emilia Attias appears on the video. The music video relates the story of a couple throughout their time together. Nahuel Lerena directed the film, shot in two studios with six decorations, and several weather effects.

Trackslisting

Charts
"Pingüinos En La Cama" became the first song by Arjona not to chart inside the top 25 of the Billboard Latin Songs chart. It reached a position of No.44 the week ending 29 April 2006. The song was more successful on the Latin Pop Songs chart, reaching No.19 the week ending 19 February 2006.

Release history

References 

2006 songs
Sony BMG Norte singles
Ricardo Arjona songs
Songs written by Ricardo Arjona